Robert B. Wood (1836 – July 1, 1878) was a Union Navy sailor in the American Civil War and a recipient of the U.S. military's highest decoration, the Medal of Honor, for his actions at the Battle of Suffolk.

Born in 1836 in New Garden, Ohio, Wood was still living in that city when he joined the Navy. For this action, he was awarded the Medal of Honor three months later, on July 10, 1863.

Wood's official Medal of Honor citation reads:
Attached to the U.S.S. Minnesota and temporarily serving on the U.S.S. Mount Washington, during action against the enemy in the Nansemond River, 14 April 1863. When the U.S.S. Mount Washington drifted against the bank and all men were driven from the decks by escaping steam following several successive hits which struck her boilers and stopped her engines, Wood boarded the stricken vessel and, despite a strike on the head by a spent ball, continued at his gun for 6 hours as fierce artillery and musketry continued to rake her decks.

Wood died at age 41 or 42 and was buried at Grove Hill Cemetery in Hanoverton, Ohio.

References 

1836 births
1878 deaths
People from Columbiana County, Ohio
People of Ohio in the American Civil War
Union Navy sailors
United States Navy Medal of Honor recipients
American Civil War recipients of the Medal of Honor